Formin-like protein 2 is a protein that in humans is encoded by the FMNL2 gene.

Expression 

Alternatively spliced transcript variants of the FMNL2 gene encoding different isoforms have been described. The full length FMNL2 (FRL3) protein (1092 amino acids-NCBI Reference Sequence: NP_443137.2) is regulated through autoinhibition, and may become activated through Rho proteins. The FMNL2 gene is expressed in multiple human tissues.

Function 

Formin-like protein 2 is a formin-related protein. Formin-related proteins have been implicated in morphogenesis, cytokinesis, and cell polarity.

Clinical significance 

FMNL2 expression is considerably higher in colorectal cancer tumors compared to normal tissue.

Clinical studies showed that single nucleotide polymorphisms in the FMNL2 gene are associated with cardio and cerebrovascular risk factors and Alzheimer's disease FMNL2 links vascular disease to increased risk of Alzheimer's disease by regulating the interaction between astrocytes and blood vessels in healthy and Alzheimer's disease brains.

See also 
 FMNL1
 FMNL3

References